Mark Steven Spencer (born 20 January 1970) is a British politician serving as Minister of State for Food, Farming and Fisheries since 2022. He previously served as Leader of the House of Commons and Lord President of the Council from February to September 2022 and as Chief Whip from 2019 to 2022. A member of the Conservative Party, he has been Member of Parliament (MP) for Sherwood since 2010.

Early life
Spencer was born on 20 January 1970. He attended Lambley Primary School and the Colonel Frank Seely School in Calverton, Nottinghamshire. He then qualified at Shuttleworth Agricultural College in Bedfordshire, before joining the family farm business. A former dairy farm, the business diversified into growing potatoes and vegetables and producing free-range eggs, beef and lamb, and employing around 50 local people. Spencer was chairman of the National Federation of Young Farmers' Clubs from 1999 to 2000. Spencer was a trustee of The Royal Agricultural Society of England and for three years, the honorary show director of the Royal Show. Additionally, he is a fellow of the Royal Agricultural Society.

Spencer is a past vice-chairman of school governors of Woodborough Woods Foundation School, where he was chairman of the Disciplinary Committee. As chairman of the Lambley Playground Fund, he helped raise over £100,000 to provide new play equipment in the village and he is also trustee of the Core Centre Calverton, an adult education centre. Spencer is the President of Bilsthorpe Heritage Museum.

In May 2001, Spencer unsuccessfully stood as a Conservative Party candidate for the Nottinghamshire County Council seat of Hucknall. However, in 2003 he gained the third seat in the safe Conservative ward of Ravenshead on Gedling District Council; he retained this seat at the local elections in 2007. In 2005, Spencer contested a different ward for the Nottinghamshire County Council elections and won the seat of Calverton for the Conservatives; he retained this seat at the local elections in 2009 with an increased majority. In 2006, Spencer was appointed Shadow Spokesman for Community Safety and Partnership for Nottinghamshire County Council.

Parliamentary career
Spencer gained the Sherwood seat from Labour at the 2010 general election with a majority of 214, after the sitting Labour MP Paddy Tipping stood down. Spencer was re-elected in 2015 and 2017. Following his election as an MP he stood down as a borough councillor and county councillor before the next local elections in 2011 and 2013 respectively.

In Parliament, Spencer has served on the Environmental Audit Committee, the Environment, Food and Rural Affairs Committee, the Backbench Business Committee, and on the Selection Committee. He formerly served as Parliamentary Private Secretary to Secretary of State for Environment, Food and Rural Affairs Liz Truss, and was appointed Assistant Government Whip on 17 July 2016, before becoming a full government whip in June 2017.

He worked on environmental issues and energy security through his roles on the Environmental Audit Committee and the Environment, Food and Rural Affairs Committee. With his farming background, Spencer has also focused in Parliament on agriculture and rural communities, with an interest in ensuring that British food production is recognised and promoted as "world class". He joined the Coalfield Communities All Party Parliamentary Group (APPG), whose aim is to restore the economies of former coalfield areas. Spencer was named the Brake Road Safety Parliamentarian of the Year 2011 for campaigning for improved road safety on the A614.

Spencer attracted criticism in February 2015 after appearing to defend a benefits system which, according to Labour MP Lisa Nandy, left a job seeker with learning disabilities unable to afford food or electricity because he was four minutes late for a job centre appointment. In response to Nandy, Spencer said: "It is important that those seeking employment learn the discipline of timekeeping, which is an important part of securing and keeping a job". Writing in The Spectator magazine, Isabel Hardman criticised his response, suggesting his rush to defend government policy without showing concern for the constituent was an example of "political tribalism at its worst". Spencer said that critics had "twisted what he said", and stood by his comments that "normal people doing normal jobs, if they turn up late they would get their wages docked".

The Telegraph reported in August 2015 that Spencer, in a letter to a constituent, had suggested that Extremism Disruption Orders (EDOs) could be used against Christian teachers who tell schoolchildren that same-sex marriage is wrong. He wrote that whilst Christians with traditionalist views are "perfectly entitled to express their views", "The EDOs, in this case, would apply to a situation where a teacher was specifically teaching that gay marriage is wrong". Simon Calvert, deputy director of the Christian Institute, an evangelical pressure group, responded: "I am genuinely shocked that we have an MP supporting the idea of teachers being branded extremists for teaching that marriage is between a man and a woman".

In May 2016, it emerged that Spencer was one of a number of Conservative MPs being investigated by police in the 2015 general election party spending investigation, for allegedly spending more than the legal limit on constituency election campaign expenses. In May 2017, the Crown Prosecution Service said that while there was evidence of inaccurate spending returns, it did not "meet the test" for further action.

As a backbench MP, Spencer chose to support the official position of the Government and campaigned for the United Kingdom to remain in the European Union before the EU membership referendum on 23 June 2016. After the result was announced, Spencer continued to support the party leadership and advocated leaving the European Union.

Spencer was criticised in 2017 by the Parliamentary Commissioner for Standards for misusing taxpayers' resources, such as the MPs' newsletter, to link to "overtly party political content". Spencer apologised and a member of his staff, Ben Bradley, was sent on a training course on how to appropriately use parliamentary resources.

Spencer was made Chief Whip on 24 July 2019 under Prime Minister Boris Johnson. He was appointed to the Privy Council the next day.

On 1 August 2020, a Conservative MP was arrested on charges of sexual assault. The Sunday Times reported that Spencer, as Chief Whip, was told of the alleged incident a month before the arrest, and did not take action. Spencer said that when the victim came forward to him, there was mention of abuse and other threatful behaviour, but no mention of sexual assault.

In January 2022, it was alleged that Conservative MP Christian Wakeford was threatened with constituency boundary changes in an attempt to secure support for Johnson over the Westminster lockdown parties controversy. Following this, Wakeford defected to the Labour Party.

Campaigns
There are local issues on which Spencer chooses to focus as MP for Sherwood. A key focus is an extension to the Robin Hood Line, which would mean the opening to passenger trains of the old freight lines from Shirebrook to Ollerton through Edwinstowe. Spencer has long argued that this extension would be an economic lifeline to the north of Nottinghamshire, better connecting the area to surrounding urban centres such as Nottingham and Sheffield. He met the then Secretary of State for Transport, Chris Grayling, to push for support from government, and regularly gives updates on his campaign in his newsletters.

Another key area of focus is road safety, and Spencer regularly meets constituents to discuss local problems on roads such as speeding and road safety outside schools. In June 2011 the road safety charity brake named him Road Safety Parliamentarian of the Month.

Personal life
Spencer lives with his wife and children in Mapperley Plains in Nottinghamshire.

Notes

References

External links 
Mark Spencer: Member of Parliament for Sherwood on the Conservative Party website

Sherwood Conservatives
Interview after winning his seat in 2010 at Catch21

|-

1970 births
Living people
Conservative Party (UK) MPs for English constituencies
UK MPs 2010–2015
UK MPs 2015–2017
UK MPs 2017–2019
UK MPs 2019–present
Councillors in Nottinghamshire
Members of Nottinghamshire County Council
Members of the Privy Council of the United Kingdom
People from Calverton, Nottinghamshire